Glancy (also Center Point) is an unincorporated community in Copiah County, Mississippi, United States.

A post office operated under the name Glancy from 1904 to 1953.

The Southern Package Corporation once operated a mill in Glancy.

Notes

Unincorporated communities in Copiah County, Mississippi
Unincorporated communities in Mississippi